Jacques and Jacotte (French: Jacques et Jacotte) is a 1936 French comedy film directed by Robert Péguy and starring Roger Tréville, Jacotte and Germaine Roger.

Cast
 Roger Tréville as Jacques  
 Jacotte as Jacotte  
 Germaine Roger as Annie  
 François Rodon as Le petit Tot  
 Milly Mathis as La concierge 
 Marcel Carpentier as L'huissier  
 Ginette Leclerc 
 Émile Saint-Ober 
 Jacques Derives

References

Bibliography 
 Crisp, Colin. Genre, Myth and Convention in the French Cinema, 1929-1939. Indiana University Press, 2002.

External links 
 

1936 films
1936 comedy films
French comedy films
1930s French-language films
Films directed by Robert Péguy
French black-and-white films
1930s French films